Anne Carolyn Klein (Lama Rigzin Drolma)  is an American Tibetologist who is a professor of Religious Studies at Rice University in Houston, Texas and co-founding director and resident teacher at Dawn Mountain, a Tibetan temple, community center and research institute.

She specializes in Buddhist thought and practice, Tibetan philosophical texts, Tibetan language, Contemplative Studies and Women's studies, with an emphasis in traditions associated with the Heart Essence Vast Expanse. Her books explore the nature of perception, consciousness and mystic experience as understood from a variety of Indian and Tibetan Buddhist traditions. Her most recent book (2015), Strand of Jewels: My Teachers' Essential Guidance on Dzogchen is a translation of the Dzogchen text by Khetsun Sangpo Rinpoche.

Buddhism teaching 
Klein has been a practicing Buddhist and student of Buddhist thought since 1971, when she studied with Kensur Ngawang Lekden, the last Abbot of the Tantric College of Lower Lhasa. She then met Geshe Wangyal in New Jersey in 1971, and began studying and practicing under Khetsun Sangpo Rinpoche of Kathmandu in 1973, and receiving teaching authorization from him in 1995, and the title of Dorje Lopon (Lama) from her teacher in Tibet, in 2010. She has studied extensively with a number of Geluk and Dzogchen teachers in India, Nepal and the United States, including Lama Gonpo Tseten.

Dawn Mountain Tibetan Temple, co-founded in Houston with  Dr. Harvey Aronson, offers a blend of traditional Tibetan Buddhist learning and practice, as well as supportive practices and cross-cultural reflection. It thus seeks to be a bridge for modern Western students seeking to understand and genuinely engage in Buddhist teachings. Klein is a contributor to Tricycle: The Buddhist Review.

In her dharma teaching, Klein emphasizes the need for embodiment in meditation practice and for an awareness that encompasses cultural as well as personal insights. Since 1998 she has been developing and leading Buddhism in the Body workshops with Phyllis Pay. These have been offered in Berkeley, Houston, Esalen Institute, and Arizona.

Education, honors, and boards 
After graduating from Harpur College (now Binghamton University) cum laude with Highest Honors in English, Anne Klein earned her M.A. in Buddhist Studies from the University of Wisconsin–Madison and her PhD in Religious/Tibetan Studies from the University of Virginia. Following this she was awarded a Teaching and Research postdoctoral position at Harvard Divinity School as a Research Associate in Women's Studies and the History of Religion. It was here that she began work on what became her book Meeting the Great Bliss Queen, putting the significance and symbolism of Yeshe Tsogyal, a female Buddha renowned throughout Tibet, in conversation with contemporary western and feminist concerns.

Anne Klein has received National Endowment for the Humanities translation grants and an American Council of Learned Societies Contemplative Studies grant. She is currently a recipient of a Ford Foundation grant under the rubric of Buddhism, Self and Gender: Traditional Buddhism and Modern Western Culture, A Living Dialogue.

She was for over twenty years a member of the board of directors of Ligmincha Institute, an international community for the study and preservation of Bon Buddhism founded by Geshe Tenzin Wangyal Rinpoche. She is also on the Board of Asia Society, Houston, and has several times been Faculty at the Mind and Life Summer Research Institute in Garrison, New York.

Bibliography

Books

Articles

References

External links 
 Rice University Faculty Bio
 Dawn Mountain Web site
Embodied Love: Core Tibetan Trainings for an Unbounded Heart a Tricycle Dharma Talk (2014)

1947 births
Living people
American Buddhists
Converts to Buddhism
Harpur College alumni
Harvard Divinity School faculty
Religious studies scholars
Rice University faculty
Tibetan Buddhism writers
Tibetan Buddhists from the United States
Tibetologists
University of Virginia alumni
University of Wisconsin–Madison College of Letters and Science alumni
Women's studies academics